Mitre Pandzharov — the Vlach was а Bulgarian revolutionary of Aromanian origin of the Internal Macedonian-Adrianople Revolutionary Organization.

He was born in 1873 in Konomladi in Ottoman Macedonia. In 1901 he joined IMARO (at the time under the name Bulgarian Macedonian-Adrianople Revolutionary Committees). It was there that he learned to read and write. In May 1903 his band was involved in a skirmish with the Ottoman Army in the village Rulja. During the Ilinden Uprising he took part in the attack on the Ottoman garrison in the village Visheni and in the battle near the village Pisoderi. In April 1904 he formed a new band. He was named commander-in-chief of the region of Kostenariya, where he fought with Greek bands on a number of occasions.

On 22 February 1907 his band was betrayed by Hristo from the village Shesteovo. Near the village Zhupanishta, he was heavily wounded and died shortly thereafter.

Mitre was buried in the village Aposkep together with his entire band.

References and notes 

1873 births
1907 deaths
Bulgarian people of Aromanian descent
Aromanian revolutionaries
Members of the Internal Macedonian Revolutionary Organization
Bulgarian revolutionaries
People from Korestia